Sylvipoa is a genus of flowering plants belonging to the family Poaceae.

Its native range is Eastern Australia.

Species:

Sylvipoa queenslandica

References

Poaceae
Poaceae genera